Uren is a town and the administrative center of Urensky District in Nizhny Novgorod Oblast, Russia, located on the right bank of the Usta River (Volga's basin),  northeast of Nizhny Novgorod, the administrative center of the oblast. It has population:

History
It was first mentioned in 1719. It was granted urban-type settlement status in 1959 and town status in 1973.

Administrative and municipal status
Within the framework of administrative divisions, Uren serves as the administrative center of Urensky District. As an administrative division, it is, together with two rural localities, incorporated within Urensky District as the town of district significance of Uren. As a municipal division, the town of district significance of Uren is incorporated within Urensky Municipal District as Uren Urban Settlement.

Transportation
There is a railway station in the town, through which the trans-Siberian railroad passes. The town also lies on Road R159.

References

Notes

Sources

Cities and towns in Nizhny Novgorod Oblast
Urensky District
Varnavinsky Uyezd